The 1957–58 Kansas State Wildcats men's basketball team represented Kansas State University as a member of the Big 7 Conference during the 1957–58 NCAA University Division men's basketball season. The head coach was Tex Winter, innovator of the Triangle offense and future member of the Basketball Hall of Fame, who was in his fifth season at the helm.  The Wildcats finished with a record of 22–5 (10–2 Big 7) and reached the Final Four.

The team played its home games at Ahearn Field House in Manhattan, Kansas.

Roster

Schedule and results

|-
!colspan=6 style=| Non-Conference Regular season

|-
!colspan=6 style=| Big Seven Regular season

|-
!colspan=6 style=| NCAA Tournament

Rankings

Awards and honors
 Bob Boozer – Consensus First-team All-American, Big Seven Player of the Year
 Tex Winter – UPI College Basketball Coach of the Year, Big Seven Coach of the Year

Team players drafted into the NBA

References

Kansas State
Kansas State
NCAA Division I men's basketball tournament Final Four seasons
Kansas State Wildcats men's basketball seasons
1957 in sports in Kansas
1958 in sports in Kansas